Marc Miller  (born March 12, 1973) is a Canadian politician who was elected to represent the riding of Ville-Marie—Le Sud-Ouest—Île-des-Sœurs in the House of Commons in the 2015 election. A member of the Liberal Party of Canada, he is currently serving as Minister of Crown Indigenous Relations in the Federal Cabinet following the swearing in of a new cabinet on October 26, 2021. Prior to entering politics, Miller was a lawyer with Stikeman Elliott and an infantry commander in the Canadian Army Primary Reserve.

Early life and career 
The son of a Nova Scotian father and an anglophone Montrealer mother, Miller attended Collège Jean-de-Brébeuf in the 1980s at the same time as Justin Trudeau, and has been described variously as "a boyhood friend of Mr. Trudeau" and "one of [Trudeau's] oldest friends." Miller earned bachelor's and master's degrees in political science from the Université de Montréal.

Miller graduated from McGill University Faculty of Law in 2001 with common and civil law degrees. Prior to his election was a practising lawyer with Stikeman Elliott. Miller also previously served in the Canadian Army Primary Reserve as an infantry commander.

Federal politics 
Miller helped organize Trudeau's first run for office in Papineau in 2007. He was an advisor and the fundraising director for Trudeau's successful run at the 2013 Liberal Party leadership election.

Miller was elected to represent the riding of Ville-Marie—Le Sud-Ouest—Île-des-Sœurs in the House of Commons in the 2015 federal election. After the election, he served as the chair of the Quebec Liberal Caucus of MPs.

On January 28, 2017 Miller was appointed as Parliamentary Secretary to the Minister of Infrastructure and Communities. On June 1, 2017, Miller delivered the first ever speech in the  Mohawk language in the House of Commons. Miller said he had started taking language lessons from Zoe Hopkins in the spirit of reconciliation. He also wanted to demonstrate to the non-French speaking Liberal MPs whom he had urged to study French in his former role as the Quebec Liberal Caucus chair that it was possible to juggle learning a new language while performing their parliamentary duties.

On August 31, 2018, he was moved to be the Parliamentary Secretary to the Minister of Crown–Indigenous Relations.

On November 20, 2019 he was sworn in as Minister of Indigenous Services.

On October 26, 2021 Miller became the Minister of Crown–Indigenous Relations.

Personal life 
Marc Miller married Elin Sandberg, a former Swedish diplomat, whom he met at a party while both were studying at the Université de Montréal. Together, they have three children, two boys named Marius and Lukas and a girl named Eva.

Miller, an anglophone, is fluently bilingual in both official languages.

Electoral record

References

External links

 Official Website
 Bio & mandate from the Prime Minister
 

Living people
1971 births
Anglophone Quebec people
Members of the 29th Canadian Ministry
Members of the King's Privy Council for Canada
Members of the House of Commons of Canada from Quebec
Military personnel from Montreal
Liberal Party of Canada MPs
Canadian Army officers
Lawyers from Montreal
Politicians from Montreal
New York (state) lawyers
Université de Montréal alumni
McGill University Faculty of Law alumni
21st-century Canadian politicians